Damirchi Haddadan (also Romanized as Damīrchī Ḩaddādān; also known as Dameshlar, Dāmeshleyār, Damīrchī, Damīrchī Kandī, Damishliār, Damyshlyar, and Ḩaddādān) is a village in Misheh Pareh Rural District, in the Central District of Kaleybar County, East Azerbaijan Province, Iran. At the 2006 census, its population was 312, in 56 families.

References 

Populated places in Kaleybar County